Xestia brunneopicta is a moth of the family Noctuidae. It is found from Magadan to the east-Siberian Tuva in Russia. It has also been recorded from northern Finland.

The larvae feed on various plants, including Andromeda polifolia, Salix phylicifolia, Larix gmelini, Larix decidua and Larix sibirica. Young larvae have a pale greenish grey body and pale brown head. Full-grown larvae reach a length of 35–40 mm. They have a brown head and the dorsal and ventral regions of the body are green, with the middorsal and subdorsal lines white, narrow, short and broken.

Life cycle gallery

References

Xestia
Moths described in 1925
Moths of Europe
Moths of Asia